Valery Vyrvich (born 5 March 1967) is a Soviet rower. He competed in the men's coxless pair event at the 1988 Summer Olympics.

References

1967 births
Living people
Soviet male rowers
Olympic rowers of the Soviet Union
Rowers at the 1988 Summer Olympics
Place of birth missing (living people)